Raakshas is a Marathi Fantasy thriller movie written and directed by Dnyanesh Zoting and produced by Nilesh Navalakha and Vivek Kajaria.The movie will see the first-time pairing of Sharad Kelkar and  Sai Tamhankar and  along with Vijay Maurya and Umesh Jagtap.Child Actor Rujuta Deshpande will portray a very important role. The film was shot in 2015.The film released on 23 February 2018.

Plot
The story revolves around a missing documentary filmmaker and his daughter’s quest to bring him back.

Cast

 Sai Tamhankar
 Sharad Kelkar
 Rujuta Deshpande
 Daya Shankar Pandey
 Vijay Maurya
 Yakub Sayeed
 Purnanand Wandhekar
 Umesh Jagtap
 Vitthal Kale
 Pankaj Sathe
 Anuya Kalaskar
 Anil Kamble
 Makarand Sathe
 Jayesh Sanghavi
 Sakshi Vyavhare
 Abhijeet Zunjarrao
 Somanath Limbarka

Critical reception

Mihir Bhanage of The Times of India gave the film a rating of 3.5 out of 5 saying that, "Raakshas explores the unexplored. Shot almost entirely in the jungle, the woods become an integral character in the story. In terms of performances, this film earns brownie points." Shriram Iyengar of Cinestaan gave the film a rating of 2 out of 5 and said that, "Dyanesh Zoting's parable of a jungle monster around the story of land-grabbing conglomerates is a good attempt at magical realism but lacks the finishing touch that could have truly made it magical." Marathi Stars praised the acting performances of Sai Tamhankar and Rujuta Deshpande, direction as well as the technical aspects of the film but criticized the conclusion given to the story. The critic said that, "A better screenplay & a more original ‘fantasy’ world would have made wonders to this film. But still as a director Dnyanesh Zoting makes his presence felt." and gave the film a rating of 2.5 out of 5. Shubhra Gupta of The Indian Express praised the concept of the film and the acting performances. The critic gave the film a rating of 2.5 out of 5 and said that, "The melding of the myth and the real is not as effective, though, and the film becomes repetitive in places. But overall, ‘Raakshas’ holds, and is a welcome step in the direction of making non-Hindi contemporary, inventive cinema accessible to all."

References

External links

2018 films
2010s fantasy thriller films
2010s Marathi-language films
Indian fantasy thriller films
Films set in jungles